In mathematics and computer science, a morphic word or substitutive word is an infinite sequence of symbols which is constructed from a particular class of endomorphism of a free monoid.

Every automatic sequence is morphic.

Definition
Let f be an endomorphism of the free monoid A∗ on an alphabet A with the property that there is a letter a such that f(a) = as for a non-empty string s: we say that f is prolongable at a.  The word

is a pure morphic or pure substitutive word.  Note that it is the limit of the sequence a, f(a), f(f(a)), f(f(f(a))), ...
It is clearly a fixed point of the endomorphism f: the unique such sequence beginning with the letter a. In general, a morphic word is the image of a pure morphic word under a coding, that is, a morphism that maps letter to letter.

If a morphic word is constructed as the fixed point of a prolongable k-uniform morphism on A∗ then the word is k-automatic.  The n-th term in such a sequence can be produced by a finite state automaton reading the digits of n in base k.

Examples
 The Thue–Morse sequence is generated over {0,1} by the 2-uniform endomorphism 0 → 01, 1 → 10.
 The Fibonacci word  is generated over {a,b} by the endomorphism a → ab, b → a.
 The tribonacci word is generated over {a,b,c} by the endomorphism a → ab, b → ac, c → a.
 The Rudin–Shapiro sequence is obtained from the fixed point of the 2-uniform morphism a → ab, b → ac, c → db, d → dc  followed by the coding a,b → 0, c,d → 1.
 The regular paperfolding sequence is obtained from the fixed point of the 2-uniform morphism a → ab, b → cb, c → ad, d → cd  followed by the coding a,b → 0, c,d → 1.

D0L system
A D0L system (deterministic context-free Lindenmayer system) is given by a word w of the free monoid A∗ on an alphabet A together with a morphism σ prolongable at w.  The system generates the infinite D0L word ω = limn→∞ σn(w).  Purely morphic words are D0L words but not conversely.  However, if ω = uν is an infinite D0L word with an initial segment u of length |u| ≥ |w|, then zν is a purely morphic word, where z is a letter not in A.

See also 
 Cutting sequence
 Lyndon word
 Hall word
 Sturmian word

References

Further reading
 

Semigroup theory
Formal languages
Combinatorics on words